{{DISPLAYTITLE:C12H15NO3}}
The molecular formula C12H15NO3 (molar mass : 221.25 g/mol) may refer to :

 Butylone (beta-Keto-Methylbenzodioxolylbutanamine)
 Carbofuran
 Ethylone (Methylenedioxyethcathinone)
 Isobubbialine
 Metaxalone